Dimension is a 2010 Danish unfinished gangster film written and directed by Lars von Trier. Production began in 1990, the film was shot in over six years from 1991 to 1997. The original intention was to continue production in four-minute segments every year for a period of 33 years for a final release in 2024. In 2002, von Trier lost interest in the project after the death of Cartlidge, Constantine, and Hugo Järegård. The unfinished film consists of the completed footage as a short film at the time, the rest of the film's development was abandoned without them.

Cast 
Von Trier was known in the same regular group of European actors including French-American Jean-Marc Barr, German Udo Kier, and Swedish Stellan Skarsgård, who were cast in several later von Trier  films: Breaking the Waves, Dancer in the Dark, Dogville, and Nymphomaniac. Also some actors appeared in the film from his previous works including Katrin Cartlidge (Breaking the Waves), Baard Owe (Medea, Europa, and Riget), Ernst-Hugo Järegård (Europa and Riget), Eddie Constantine (Europa), Jens Okking (Riget).

See also
List of films shot over three or more years
List of abandoned and unfinished films

References

External links 
 
 

2010 films
Danish short films
Films directed by Lars von Trier
2010s unfinished films
Films produced by Peter Aalbæk Jensen
2010s English-language films

Danish crime films